The 1924 United States presidential election in Pennsylvania took place on November 4, 1924 as part of the 1924 United States presidential election. Voters chose 38 representatives, or electors to the Electoral College, who voted for president and vice president.

Pennsylvania overwhelmingly voted for the Republican nominee, President Calvin Coolidge, over the Democratic nominee, former United States Ambassador to the United Kingdom John W. Davis. Coolidge won Pennsylvania by a landslide margin of 46.26%.

Coolidge was credited for the booming economy while the Democratic electorate was divided between the conservative Davis and the liberal third-party candidate Robert La Follette who ran as a Progressive. This was the first presidential election in which all American Indians were citizens and thus allowed to vote.

The 1920s were a fiercely Republican decade in American politics, and Pennsylvania in that era was a fiercely Republican state in presidential elections. The economic boom and social good feelings of the Roaring Twenties under popular Republican leadership virtually guaranteed Calvin Coolidge an easy win in the state against the conservative Southern Democrat John Davis, who had little appeal in Northern states like Pennsylvania.

With 65.34% of the popular vote, Pennsylvania would prove to be Coolidge's fourth strongest state in the 1924 election in terms of popular vote percentage after Vermont, Michigan and Maine.

Results

Results by county

See also
 List of United States presidential elections in Pennsylvania

Notes

References

Pennsylvania
1924
1924 Pennsylvania elections